The Sun Ba Power Plant or Fong Der Power Plant is a combined cycle gas-fired power plant in Shanshang District, Tainan, Taiwan. The installed capacity of the power plant is 980 MW.

History
The power plant was commissioned on 29 March 2004. It has an IPP agreement with Taiwan Power Company for 25 years.

See also 

 List of power stations in Taiwan
 Electricity sector in Taiwan

References 

2004 establishments in Taiwan
Buildings and structures in Tainan
Energy infrastructure completed in 2004
Natural gas-fired power stations in Taiwan